Echyridella menziesii, the New Zealand freshwater mussel, also known by its Māori names kākahi, kāeo, and torewai, is a species of freshwater mussel endemic to New Zealand. E. menziesii is an aquatic bivalve mollusc in the family Unionidae, the river mussels.

They were an important food source for the Māori, but like many freshwater mussels worldwide, are now endangered by pollution and eutrophication of rivers, and the introduction of new species of fish leading to actions via the Treaty of Waitangi claims process.

It is one of three species of native freshwater mussels identified in New Zealand, the other two being Cucumerunio websteri, and the more recently discovered Echyridella lucasi

Distribution
Formerly common in lakes, rivers and streams in New Zealand.

Life cycle
Its reproductive cycle is typical of other freshwater mussels, requiring a host fish on which its larvae (glochidia) parasitise and metamorphose into juvenile mussels – most commonly the kōaro (Galaxias brevipinnis).

Threats
The destruction or modification of the habitat of the New Zealand freshwater mussel is likely to be a factor in the decline of its population. This modification or destruction of freshwater habitat is also likely to be a factor in the decline in numbers of the mussel's host fish, the kōaro.

Conservation status and efforts
In May 2014 the Department of Conservation classified the New Zealand freshwater mussel under the New Zealand Threat Classification System as "At risk" and "declining".

References

Further reading
 Powell A. W. B., New Zealand Mollusca, William Collins Publishers Ltd, Auckland, New Zealand 1979 
 Manual of the New Zealand mollusca, 1913, Henry Suter
Spencer, H.G., R.C. Willan, B. Marshall & T.J. Murray. 2011. Checklist of the Recent Mollusca recorded from the New Zealand Exclusive Economic Zone.

External links

 Lectotype specimen collected by William Colenso and held at Museum of New Zealand Te Papa Tongarewa.

Unionidae
Bivalves of New Zealand
Bivalves described in 1843
Taxa named by John Edward Gray
Endemic fauna of New Zealand
Endemic molluscs of New Zealand